Sara Bauer (born May 11, 1984) played for the Wisconsin Badgers women's ice hockey program. In four years, she accumulated 218 points. Bauer won the Patty Kazmaier Memorial Award in 2006. During the 2008–09 NCAA season, the WCHA honored its Top 10 Players from the First Decade. Among the group of top 10 players, was former Wisconsin forward Sara Bauer.

Playing career

Hockey Canada
She was invited to the selection camp of the Canadian National Women's Under 22 team in 2004–05. Other invitees at the camp included future Olympians Gillian Apps, Meghan Agosta, Tessa Bonhomme and Sarah Vaillancourt. She would represent Canada at the 2006 Air Canada Cup, played in Ravensburg, Germany from January 5–7, 2006.

Wisconsin
Bauer was the 2007 WCHA Player of the Year and its scoring champion. In 2006, Bauer helped lead Wisconsin to a national title. During the 2006–07, Bauer registered at least a point in 28 of the team's games.

Career stats

Hockey Canada

Wisconsin

Awards and honours
 2006 Patty Kazmaier Award winner
 NCAA Women's Frozen Four Most Outstanding Player (2007)
Finalist, 2007 Patty Kazmaier Award 
WCHA Top 10 Players of the Decade (2000’s)

Sara Bauer Academy
Bauer started her own hockey academy, training young males and female athletes. Her program is based out of St. Catharines, Ontario.

References

External links
 

1984 births
Canadian women's ice hockey players
Ice hockey people from Ontario
Living people
Patty Kazmaier Award winners
Sportspeople from St. Catharines
Wisconsin Badgers women's ice hockey players